Robert Beede Wood (September 18, 1885 – July 15, 1964) was an American politician who was a member of the Wisconsin State Assembly.

Early life
Wood was born on September 18, 1885, in what is now Lake Preston, South Dakota. At the time it was located in the Dakota Territory. He held a number of jobs before eventually becoming a bank president.

Political career
He was a member of the Assembly during the 1925 and 1927 sessions. Other positions he held included village president (similar to mayor) and school board member. He was a Republican.

Personal life and death
Wood died on July 15, 1964, at the age of 78.

References

1885 births
1964 deaths
American bank presidents
People from Kingsbury County, South Dakota
People from Adams County, Wisconsin
Republican Party members of the Wisconsin State Assembly
Mayors of places in Wisconsin
School board members in Wisconsin